Humaid Fakher  is a UAE football defender who played for United Arab Emirates in the 2004 Asian Cup. He also played for Al Ain FC and Baniyas Club

External links

1978 births
Living people
2004 AFC Asian Cup players
2007 AFC Asian Cup players
Al Ain FC players
Baniyas Club players
Association football defenders
Emirati footballers
United Arab Emirates international footballers